This is a complete alphabetical list of constituency election results in England to the 33rd Parliament of the United Kingdom at the 1923 general election, held on 5 December 1923. See Constituency election results in the 1923 United Kingdom general election for the rest of the United Kingdom.

Notes 
 Change in % vote and swing is calculated between the winner and second place and their respective performances at the 1922 election. A plus denotes a swing to the winner and a minus against the winner.

London Boroughs 

|}

|}

|}

|}

|}

|}

|}

|}

|}

|}

|}

|}

|}

|}

|}

|}

|}

|}

|}

|}

|}

|}

|}

|}

|}

|}

|}

|}

|}

|}

|}

|}

|}

|}

|}

|}

|}

|}

|}

|}

|}

|}

|}

|}

|}

|}

|}

|}

|}

|}

|}

|}

|}

|}

|}

|}

|}

|}

|}

|}

Rest of England

A to E 

|}

|}

|}

|}

|}

|}

|}

|}

|}

|}

|}

|}

|}

|}

|}

|}

|}

|}

|}

|}

|}

|}

|}

|}

|}

|}

|}

|}
 Ford stood on a Free Trade platform

|}

|}

|}

|}

|}

|}

|}

|}

|}

|}

|}

|}

|}

|}

|}

|}

|}

|}

|}

|}

|}

|}

|}

|}

|}

|}

|}

|}

|}

|}

|}

|}

|}

|}

|}

|}

|}

|}

|}

|}
 The local Liberal Association was unable to agree to a candidate, but Moreing was recognised as the official candidate by Liberal Party HQ. Upon election, Jones took the Liberal whip.

|}

|}

|}

|}

|}

|}

|}

|}

|}

|}

|}

|}

|}

|}

|}

|}

|}

|}

|}

|}

|}

|}

|}

|}

|}

|}

|}

|}

|}

|}

|}

|}

|}

|}

|}

|}

|}

|}

|}

|}

|}

|}

|}

|}

|}

|}

|}

|}

|}

|}

|}

|}

|}

|}

|}

|}

|}

|}

|}

|}

|}

|}

|}

|}

F to K 

|}

|}

|}

|}

|}

|}

|}

|}

|}

|}

|}

|}

|}

|}

|}

|}

|}

|}

|}

|}

|}

|}

|}

|}

|}

|}

|}

|}

|}

|}

|}

|}

|}

|}

|}

|}

|}

|}

|}

|}

|}

|}

|}

|}

|}

|}

|}

|}

|}

|}

|}

|}

|}

|}

|}

|}

|}

|}

|}

|}

|}

|}

|}

|}

L to P 

|}

|}

|}

|}

|}

|}

|}

|}

|}
 elected as a National Liberal in 1922

|}

|}

|}

|}

|}

|}

|}

|}

|}

|}

|}

|}

|}

|}

|}

|}

|}

|}

|}

|}

|}

|}

|}

|}

|}

|}

|}

|}

|}

|}

|}

|}

|}

|}

|}

|}

|}

|}

|}

|}

|}

|}

|}

|}

|}

|}

|}

|}

|}

|}

|}

|}

|}

|}

|}

|}

|}

|}

|}

|}

|}

|}

|}

|}

|}

|}

|}

|}

|}

|}

|}

|}

|}

|}

|}

|}

|}

|}

|}

|}

|}

|}

|}

|}

|}

|}

|}

|}

R to Z 

|}

|}

|}

|}

|}

|}

|}

|}

|}

|}

|}

|}

|}

|}

|}

|}

|}

|}

|}

|}

|}

|}

|}

|}

|}

|}

|}

|}

|}

|}

|}

|}

|}

|}

|}

|}

|}

|}

|}

|}

|}

|}

|}

|}

|}

|}

|}

|}

|}

|}

|}

|}

|}

|}

|}

|}

|}

|}

|}

|}

|}

|}

|}

|}

|}

|}

|}

|}

|}

|}

|}

|}

|}

|}

|}

|}

|}

|}

|}

|}

|}

|}

|}

|}

|}

|}

|}

|}

|}

|}

|}

|}

|}

|}

|}

|}

|}

|}

|}

|}

|}

|}

|}

|}

|}

|}

|}

|}

|}

|}

|}

|}

|}

|}

|}

|}

|}

|}

|}

References 

1923 England
Constituency election results in the 1923 United Kingdom general election, England